The Trinidad and Tobago Independence Act 1962 (c. 54) was an Act of the Parliament of the United Kingdom that granted independence to Trinidad and Tobago with effect from 31 August 1962.

As a result of the Act, Trinidad and Tobago became an independent country in the West Indies achieving independence from the United Kingdom.

Background to enactment 

The bill was first presented in the House of Commons of the United Kingdom as the Trinidad and Tobago Independence Bill on 4 July 1962, by Secretary of State for the Colonies, Reginald Maudling. It was passed in the House of Commons after a third reading and committee on 6 July 1962, without amendments.
It entered the House of Lords on 9 July 1962 and was read by George Petty-Fitzmaurice, 8th Marquess of Lansdowne (The Minister of State for Colonial Affairs) on 16 July 1962. It was passed in the House of Lords on 26 July 1962 without any amendments.

The bill received Royal assent on 1 August 1962, from Queen Elizabeth II.

Content

Key areas of the Act included:
Section 1 - ceding responsibility from the United Kingdom
Section 2 - effects of citizenship and British nationality. This section was later repealed by the British Nationality Act 1981.
First Schedule - granting legislative powers to the legislature of Trinidad and Tobago

See also

History of Trinidad and Tobago
List of Acts of the Parliament of the United Kingdom, 1960–79

References 

Independence acts in the Parliament of the United Kingdom
United Kingdom Acts of Parliament 1962
1962 in politics
1962 in international relations
History of Trinidad and Tobago
Trinidad and Tobago–United Kingdom relations
Trinidad and Tobago and the Commonwealth of Nations
United Kingdom and the Commonwealth of Nations